Amor Chadli (14 May 1925 – 8 November 2019) was a Tunisian physician and politician from Tunis who served as Minister of Education from 1986 to 1987. He also served as director of the Pasteur Institute of Tunis between 1963 and 1988. Chadli was the founding dean of the Medicine School of Tunis 1964 from 1971, and returned to the deanship from 1974 to 1976.

References

1925 births
2019 deaths
Government ministers of Tunisia
Deans (academic)
People from Tunis
20th-century Tunisian politicians
20th-century Tunisian physicians